In Greek mythology, Phereus (Ancient Greek: Φηρεύς) may refer to the following personages:

 Phereus, the "playful" leader of the satyrs who joined the army of Dionysus in his campaign against India.
Phereus, a Theban prince as one of the Niobids, children of King Amphion and Niobe, daughter of King Tantalus of Lydia. He was the brother of Alalcomeneus, Eudorus, Argeius, Lysippus, Xanthus, Pelopia, Chione, Clytia, Hore, Lamippe and Melia.

Phereus, also called Pheres and Thyreus, a Calydonian prince as the son of King Oeneus and Althaea, daughter of King Thestius of Pleuron. He was the brother of Deianeira, Meleager, Toxeus, Clymenus, Periphas, Agelaus and Gorge. When the war between the Curetes and the Calydonians broke out, Phereus along with his brothers, including Meleager, all fell during the battle.
 Phereus, an Achaean warrior who participated in the Trojan War.

Note

References 

 Antoninus Liberalis, The Metamorphoses of Antoninus Liberalis translated by Francis Celoria (Routledge 1992). Online version at the Topos Text Project.
 Apollodorus, The Library with an English Translation by Sir James George Frazer, F.B.A., F.R.S. in 2 Volumes, Cambridge, MA, Harvard University Press; London, William Heinemann Ltd. 1921. ISBN 0-674-99135-4. Online version at the Perseus Digital Library. Greek text available from the same website.
 Gaius Julius Hyginus, Fabulae from The Myths of Hyginus translated and edited by Mary Grant. University of Kansas Publications in Humanistic Studies. Online version at the Topos Text Project.
 Hesiod, Catalogue of Women from Homeric Hymns, Epic Cycle, Homerica translated by Evelyn-White, H G. Loeb Classical Library Volume 57. London: William Heinemann, 1914. Online version at theoi.com
Nonnus of Panopolis, Dionysiaca translated by William Henry Denham Rouse (1863-1950), from the Loeb Classical Library, Cambridge, MA, Harvard University Press, 1940.  Online version at the Topos Text Project.
Nonnus of Panopolis, Dionysiaca. 3 Vols. W.H.D. Rouse. Cambridge, MA., Harvard University Press; London, William Heinemann, Ltd. 1940-1942. Greek text available at the Perseus Digital Library.
 Quintus Smyrnaeus, The Fall of Troy translated by Way. A. S. Loeb Classical Library Volume 19. London: William Heinemann, 1913. Online version at theoi.com
 Quintus Smyrnaeus, The Fall of Troy. Arthur S. Way. London: William Heinemann; New York: G.P. Putnam's Sons. 1913. Greek text available at the Perseus Digital Library.

Achaeans (Homer)
Princes in Greek mythology
Aetolian characters in Greek mythology
Aetolian mythology